The Women's giant slalom competition at the 2017 World Championships was held on 16 February 2017.

A qualification was held on 13 February 2017.

Results
The first run started at 09:45 and the second run at 13:00.

References

Women's giant slalom
2017 in Swiss women's sport
FIS